Sarah Moore (born 22 October 1993) is a British racing driver. She won the Ginetta Junior Championship in 2009 and competed in the InterSteps Championship in 2011. She was awarded the Rising Star status by the British Racing Drivers' Club in 2009. Moore was the first female racing driver to win a TOCA-sanctioned race, and the first to win a junior mixed-gender, national-level series in the UK. She is the first female to have won the Britcar Endurance Championship.

Career
Moore, born in Harrogate, competed in the Rotax Mini Max class of the Stars of Tomorrow National Championship in 2007, finishing 24th. She also drove for Tockwith Motorsports in both the Ginetta Junior Championship and the Ginetta Junior Winter Championship. In the Ginetta Junior Championship, she entered the season finale at Brands Hatch, with her best result being 15th in the first race of the day. For 2008, she entered the BRDC Stars of Tomorrow MiniMax Championship, finishing 40th overall, but the Ginetta Junior Championship became her primary focus, as she competed in the full season for Tockwith Motorsports. She finished the season in 17th place, with her best race finish being a sixth place at Silverstone. She also entered the Ginetta Junior Championship Winter Series that year, finishing all four races on the podium, with one victory, and finishing as runner-up to Josh Hill.

Moore remained in the Ginetta Junior Championship in 2009 with Tockwith Motorsports, and won the title, having taken five wins, and scored sixteen more points than runner-up Jake Cook. She also became the first female driver to win a race in a series that formed part of the TOCA package, the first to win a mixed-gender series in the UK, and was awarded the BRDC Rising Star status. As a result of this, she was shortlisted for the BBC Young Sports Personality of the Year award, eventually being ranked fifth. In addition to this, she was named as the British Club Driver of the Year at the Autosport Awards, and joined the YourRacingCar.com scheme. The owner of Ginetta Cars, Lawrence Tomlinson, praised Moore, stating "Seeing Sarah go on stage at the awards in front of 1,400 industry heads has been one of the proudest moments in Ginetta's history."

In 2010, Moore received the Lord Wakefield Award from the BWRDC. Sarah and her brother David switched to the Eurotech Racing team, but remained in the Ginetta Junior Championship. She was less successful that year, with the series having changed to the Ginetta G40; she didn't finish on the podium until the 17th race of the season, held at Donington Park, and finished seventh overall. In 2011, she graduated to the new InterSteps Championship series, and returned to the family-run Tockwith Motorsport team, who were entering under the "TMS Atlantic" name. Having taken two fourth-place finishes in the first two races, she eventually finished the season in sixth place. She also competed in the first ever series of the 4Two Cup that year, taking a single victory.

She entered the 4Two Cup again in 2012, finishing second twice out of the four the races held at Spa-Francorchamps, and third in both races held at Snetterton. Moore also drove a Smart ForTwo alongside her brother Nigel in the Donington Park round of the Britcar Production Cup that year, finishing twentieth overall. Moore started in the reformed Britcar Endurance Championship in 2017, with professional Smart driver Rob Baker in a ForFour run by his S2Smarts team. She drove in the last 3 rounds of the championship, and in the end, Moore and Baker were fourth in the overall Sprint category standings and first in class. In round six at Oulton Park, she raced alongside her brother, Ed and father, Simon, who were both in Tockwith Ginetta G50s. Sarah upgraded to a Ginetta G50 with Tockwith Motorsport in the Endurance category with Matt Greenwood, eventually winning the endurance category overall in the first race at Brands Hatch. In 2019, driving with Moh Ritson, Sarah returned in a Tockwith Motorsport G50, but it hasn't been a great season for them. In round six at Snetterton, Moore was needed in the final round of the WSeries at Brands Hatch, so brother Ed took over driving duties, but mechanical issues hindered his return to Britcar for the rest of the weekend.

Personal life
Her brothers David, Nigel and Edward are all racing drivers. Her father, Simon, runs the Tockwith Motorsports team, and owns Tockwith Motorsports Centre, which was founded by her grandfather Reg. She stated in 2010 that she wanted to become Britain's first female Formula One driver.

Moore is lesbian and is married to Carlajane Metcalfe. She is a Driver Ambassador for Racing Pride, an LGBT rights charity working in the motorsport industry to promote inclusivity across the sport, and amongst its technological and commercial partners.

Racing record

Complete Ginetta Junior Championship results
(key) (Races in bold indicate pole position – 1 point awarded just in first race; races in italics indicate fastest lap – 1 point awarded all races;-

Complete Britcar Endurance Championship results
(key) (Races in bold indicate pole position in class – 1 point awarded in race one) (Races in italics indicate fastest lap in class – 1 point awarded in all races)

Complete W Series results
(key) (Races in bold indicate pole position) (Races in italics indicate fastest lap)

References

External links
Tockwith Motorsports

Living people
1993 births
English racing drivers
English female racing drivers
Sportspeople from Harrogate
W Series drivers
Lesbian sportswomen
LGBT racing drivers
Britcar drivers
Ginetta Junior Championship drivers